Ordes is a comarca in the Galician Province of A Coruña. The total population of this  local region is 18,496 (2005).

Municipalities
Cerceda, Frades, Mesía, Ordes, Oroso, Tordoia and Trazo.

Comarcas of the Province of A Coruña